Argentina competed at the 1976 Summer Olympics in Montreal, Quebec, Canada. A total of 69 competitors, 65 men and 4 women, took part in 50 events in 12 sports. No medals were won by Argentine athletes for the first time since 1920.

Athletics

Men

Decathlon

Boxing

Cycling

Equestrian

Dressage

Eventing

Show jumping

Fencing

Field hockey

Head Coach: Mario Ranalli

Julio César Cufre (GK)
Jorge Sabbione
Jorge Disera
Osvaldo Zanni
Jorge Ivorra
Luis Antonio Costa
Marcelo Garraffo
Flavio de Giacomi
Fernando Calp
Alberto Sabbione
Daniel Portugués
Alfredo Quaquarini
Gustavo Paolucci
César Raguso

Group play

 Qualified for semifinals

Judo

Rowing

Sailing

Open

Shooting

Swimming

Men

Women

Wrestling

Men's freestyle

Men's Greco-Roman

Key

DQ – Won/lost by passivity.
TF – Won/lost by fall.

References

Nations at the 1976 Summer Olympics
1976 Summer Olympics
1976 in Argentine sport